The North East Combined Authority, abbreviated to NECA, is one of three combined authorities in North East England. It was created in 2014, and currently consists of the City of Sunderland; Metropolitan Borough of Gateshead, South Tyneside; and Durham County local authorities.

The local authorities for Newcastle upon Tyne; North Tyneside; and Northumberland were included in the combined authority until 2018, when they left to form their own combined authority, the North of Tyne Combined Authority. For transport policy, both combined authorities have a joint transport committee. Other authorities in the North East England region that are not in the North of Tyne or the North East areas are part of the Tees Valley Combined Authority.

The North East Combined Authority was established in 2014 by statutory instrument under the Local Democracy, Economic Development and Construction Act 2009. It has some powers over economic development and regeneration.

It was announced in October 2015 that the authority would receive an enhanced devolution settlement and elect a mayor in 2017. These plans were later cancelled by the Communities and Local Government Secretary Sajid Javid on 8 September 2016 after Durham, Gateshead, South Tyneside, and Sunderland Councils withdrew their support. NECA remains a non-mayoral combined authority.

History
In order to create a combined authority, the local authorities in the proposed area must undertake a governance review and produce a scheme of their proposals.

At the first meeting of NECA on 15 April 2014, Simon Henig, the Leader of Durham County Council, was elected as chair.

Upon formation, the functions, property, rights and liabilities of the former Tyne and Wear Integrated Transport Authority were inherited by the North East Combined Authority, forming an executive body within the new authority as the Tyne and Wear Passenger Transport Executive.

Naming
The order which established the combined authority referred to it as the Durham, Gateshead, Newcastle Upon Tyne, North Tyneside, Northumberland, South Tyneside and Sunderland Combined Authority, simply listing the names of the constituent councils in alphabetical order. The initial consultation used the name Durham, Northumberland and Tyne and Wear Combined Authority. The body uses the name North East Combined Authority or NECA.  The board is known as the North East Leadership Board. The legal name of the authority was changed to Durham, Gateshead, South Tyneside and Sunderland Combined Authority in November 2018.

Membership
The membership of the combined authority is as follows:

Local government

The combined authority consists of the following authorities ( population estimates):

References

External links

North East Local Enterprise Partnership
Background from Gateshead Council

Combined authorities
Local government in North East England
Local government in Tyne and Wear
Local government in County Durham